Rosa Costa (born 25 December 1964) is a former synchronized swimmer from Spain. She competed in the women's solo competition at the 1984 Summer Olympics.

References 

1964 births
Living people
Spanish synchronized swimmers
Olympic synchronized swimmers of Spain
Synchronized swimmers at the 1984 Summer Olympics